Salem, is a major city in Salem district, located on the banks of Thirumanimutharu river in the Indian state of Tamil Nadu. Salem is the fifth largest urban agglomeration and metropolitan city in the state by population next to Chennai, Coimbatore, Madurai, Tiruchirappalli  and the fifth largest city in Tamil Nadu by area covering .

History

Early period 
During the third century BCE, there was the period of Bogar – a notable Tamil Siddhar, and at that time Jainism and Buddhism arrived. Around the beginning of the common era, the existence of a culturally and economically advanced society in Salem two thousand years ago is evident from the discovery of silver coins of the Roman Emperor Tiberices Claudices Nero (37–68 CE) in Koneripatti of Salem in 1987. Later, the Pandya dynasty started ruling the region around Salem. Afterwards, the Pallava dynasty arose in Salem, followed by Mahendra Varma Pallava coming to Salem and the rise of Saivite principles. Mahendra Varma Pallava was succeeded by Narasimha Varma Pallava. Soon, the Pandya dynasty ruled over Salem. The Hoysala rule established in Salem and parts around Salem was retained under the Pandya dynasty.

Medieval period 
The city has also been a part of the Chola Dynasty. A mosque in the city is believed to have been built by Tipu Sultan, the ruler of Mysore Kingdom in the present-day state of Karnataka. The town and the surrounding hilly regions were part of the Chola dynasty and were part of the trade route with the Roman empire. It was later governed by Poligars, who built temples and forts in and around the city. It was part of the Vijayanagara empire before being captured by Hyder Ali during the early 18th century, after the Mysore-Madurai war. It was ceded to the British in 1768 and the area became part of the struggle between Kongu Nadu, led by Dheeran Chinnamalai, and the British.

Modern period
Salem became part of Salem district since independence in 1947. Salem district was the first district to be formed in India on 4 April 1792 that spread over 7,530 sq km comprising the present-day Namakkal, Dharmapuri, Krishnagiri. Alexander Reed was the collector of the Salem district from 1792 to 1799.

Until 2008, the city was part of the Salem I and Salem II assembly constituencies.

Geography and climate

The city is surrounded by hills: Nagaramalai on the north, Jarugumalai on the south, Kanjamalai on the west, Godumalai on the east and the Shevaroy Hills on the northeast. Kariyaperumal Hill is in southwestern Salem. The Thirumanimutharu River flows through the city, dividing it in two. The fort area is the oldest part of Salem.

Location

Salem lies in the foothills of Shevaroy hills which houses the famous hill Station 'Yercaud'.

Water bodies
Mettur Dam is the main water resource for Salem District.

Climate
Salem has a tropical savanna climate (Köppen climate classification Aw). January and February are generally pleasant; the hot summer begins in March, with the year's highest temperatures during April. Pre-monsoon thunderstorms occur during April and May. The Southwest monsoon season lasts from June to September. The northeast monsoon occurs from October to December.

Administration and politics

Municipal corporation

Salem is the headquarters of Salem district. The town was constituted as a municipality in 1867, and was upgraded to a special-grade municipality in 1979 and to a municipal corporation on 1 April 1994. The Salem municipal corporation has 72 wards, each with an elected councillor. The functions of the municipal corporation are divided into six departments: general administration and personnel, engineering, revenue, public health, city planning and information technology (IT). All six departments are governed by a municipal commissioner. Legislative power is vested in the 60-member council, headed by an elected chairperson and assisted by a deputy chairperson.

State Assembly
In 2008, the constituencies of Salem were redrawn as Salem North, Salem South and Salem West. The city elects the three members to the Tamil Nadu Legislative Assembly once every five years. Present MLAs are R. Rajendhran (Salem North) from Desiya Murpokku Dravidar Kazhagam, Arul Ramadoss (Salem West) from Paattali Makkal Katchi and Balasubramanian (Salem South) from All India Anna Dravida Munnetra Kazhagam.

Parliament
The city is part of the Salem Lok Sabha constituency. The current Member of Parliament from the constituency is S. R. Parthiban from the DMK.

Law enforcement

 
Law and order is maintained by the Salem city subdivision of the Tamil Nadu Police, headed by a Police commissioner. Special units include prohibition enforcement, district crime, social justice and human rights, district crime records and a district-level special branch headed by a superintendent of police.

Salem district have central prison at Hastampatti . It's one of the oldest jail and can able to host 1431 in house prisoners.

Economy

Salem is a major textile centre in Tamil Nadu, with more than 125 spinning mills, weaving units and garment units. Until the 1960s, it had fewer spinning mills. Private handloom weaving began to increase in the region after the 1960s and during the 1980s, the textile industry expanded with major spinning mills and dyeing units established supporting the industry.

The area also houses a number of sago factories for the production starch. In Salem district,  of land are devoted to cassava and 650 industrial units are engaged in tapioca processing. In 1981, the Salem Starch and Sago Manufacturers Service Industrial Co-operative Society (SAGOSERVE) was established to promote the sago industry and nearly 80 percent of the national demand for sago and starch is met by SAGOSERVE. In and around Salem cassava yields are 25–30 tons per hectare, one of the highest in the world; the national average is 19 tons per hectare, and the world average is 10 tons.

The Salem Steel Plant, a unit of the Steel Authority of India, produces cold-rolled stainless steel and a hot-rolled stainless-carbon steel alloy. The plant is being expanded and modernized, with plans for steel-melting and continuous-casting facilities. The Southern Iron and Steel Company (part of JSW Steel) have their first integrated steel plant in Salem for the production of TMT corrosion-resistant bars and alloy steels. The Salem region is rich in mineral ores, with some of the largest magnesite and bauxite deposits in India. Public and private magnesite factories include Burn Standard and Company, Dalmia Magnesites and Tata Refractories.

Salem Mango belt contributes the economy in large scale by exporting mangoes to foreign countries and supplying mangoes all over India. The Leigh Bazaar is the region's largest market for agricultural products. The Tamil Nadu government and the Electronics Corporation of Tamil Nadu are planning a  IT park in the city. The Steel Authority of India is planning a  steel special economic zone in its Salem plant, and an electrical and electronics industrial estate is in the Suramangalam area of the city.

Salem is also famous for its silver jewelry. Shevapet, Sivathapuram and Panangadu are the areas where the Silver Products are made in cottage industries. Salem produces World Class Artistic Silver Anklets, Toe Rings, Neck Chains, Pendents and Silverware. Salem has the presence of Multi-National Corporations, including Capgemini, First American (India) Financial Corporation (FAI), Whirlpool Warehouse, Vee Technologies, and SourceHOV LLC. The Tamil Nadu government is trying to get Hindustan Aeronautics Limited on board to set up a manufacturing unit at Salem as the state has been chosen for establishing the center's ambitious defense corridor project with Salem being one of the nodes.

Demographics

Salem had a population of 826,267 in the 2011 census. There were 987 females for every 1,000 males, significantly higher than the national average of 929. The main language spoken is Tamil. Kannada is spoken among Devayanga community. A total of 79,067 were under age six: 40,570 males and 38,497 females. The city's literacy rate was 76.37 percent, higher than the national average of 72.99 percent. Salem had 215,747 households and a total of 332,147 workers: 1,599 farmers, 3,040 agricultural laborers, 32,597 in household industries, 278,892 other workers, 16,019 part-time workers, 165 part-time farmers, 544 part-time agricultural workers, 1,937 part-time workers in household industries and 13,373 other part-time workers. As per the religious census of 2011, Salem had 89.79% Hindus, 7.48% Muslims, 2.36% Christians, 0.11% Jains, 0.02% Sikhs, 0.01% Buddhists, 0.2% following other religions and 0.02% following no religion or did not indicate any religious preference.

Religious landmarks

Salem has several Hindu temples. The Kottai Mariamman Temple, dedicated to the goddess Mariamman, has an annual five-day festival during the Tamizh month of Aadi (mid-July to mid-August). The temple's gopuram is made up of seven tiers. Sugavaneshwarar Temple is dedicated to Shiva, and according to mythology the sage Sugha Brahmarishi is worshiped there. Arunagirinadhar sang a song about Muruga in the temple, which was built during the 13th century by Mamannan Sundara Pandiyan. Kottai Perumal Temple, Skandhashram,

Jamia Masjid is Salem's oldest mosque and lies on the southern bank of the Thirumanimutharu River in the heart of the city. It was reportedly built by the Kingdom of Mysore  ruler Tipu Sultan, who is said to have prayed here. The Masjid Inam granted to the mosque in 1862 was confirmed by the British with a special resolution in 1880.
	 
Christ Church is located on Fort Road and the church was consecrated in 1875. The other popular churches in and around the city include the Lechler Memorial Church, which is the oldest church in Salem, was built in 1856 by a German missionary in Fort Salem.

Shopping and recreation

Salem's traditional shopping areas are in the Town area, with major retailers in Bazaar Street, Car Street, First Agraharam and Chinna Kadai Street. Shevapet and the Fort area are noted for hardware and furniture, and Leigh Bazaar in Shevapet is the main wholesale market.

Reliance Shopping Mall, the city's largest shopping complex is situated near Five Roads. Other malls in the city are Nirmal Skywin mall and Kandaswarna Mega mall.

Kurumbapatti Zoological Park and Anna Park are government-run parks. Paravasa Ulagam and Dream Land are amusement parks in the city. Mookaneri (Kannankurichi) within the city limits is a popular tourist place and bird watching destination.

The ghat road starts at the end of the Salem City limits. The ghat road is a picturesque spot and attracts a lot of early morning walkers and joggers. Yercaud is also a famous weekend getaway for the people of Salem and nearby districts and states.

Cuisine
Thattu vadai Set (or simply called as settu) is a savory snack and popular street food, which originated in Salem and is now available in other cities in Tamil Nadu like Chennai. It is a very famous street snack available at almost every small stall set up on the streets of Salem. The sandwich consists of two crunchy thattai discs with fillings such as crispy beetroot, carrot and other vegetables smeared with green and red chutneys. Norukkal Mix, another popular snack is smashed murukku mixed with chutney, groundnut, coconut, sliced tomatoes and Chillipowder (Molagapodi). Egg Settu, Murukku Settu and Maanga Settu are the different varieties of Thattu vadai Set .

Transport

Road
Salem has six arterial roads: Omalur Road, Cherry Road, Saradha College Road, Junction Main Road, Trichy Road and Attur Road. Three National Highways originate from or pass through Salem:  NH 44 (Srinagar via Madurai and Tirunelveli Kanyakumari), NH 544 (Salem – Kochi via Erode and Coimbatore and Tiruppur )and NH 79 (Salem – Ulundurpet).

Salem is the headquarters of the Salem division of TNSTC. The city has two major bus stations: the MGR Integrated Bus Terminus in Meyyanoor and the Town Bus Station (Old Bus Stand) in the town area. Intercity and interstate routes and private buses originate at the Central Bus Stand (New Bus Stand), and local buses originate at the Old Bus Stand. The Anna Flyover is the oldest in the city, and the Trumpet Interchange was built in the realignment of NH 544 to ease traffic towards Coimbatore. A new double-decker flyover runs within main city centres like New bus stand, 5 roads, saratha college road, 4 roads to ease congestion on these roads. It is the longest double-decker flyover in Tamil Nadu covering a length of 7.87 km.

The Town Bus terminus is being upgraded into a double decker bus terminus, the first of this kind in the state under the smart City scheme
. The terminal building of the New Bus terminus is also reconstructed under the smart City scheme.

A new bus port has also been proposed for the city at Jagirammapalayam near IT park with an area of about 61 acres. This includes a bypass road to connect the Ayothiapattinam area of the city with the bus port.

Other bus stands include the Omalur bus station and Attayampatti bus station in the outskirts of the city.

Rail
In 2005, the Railway Board approved the creation of a Salem railway division from Palakkad and Tiruchirapalli divisions. It is the fourth-largest of the six Southern Railway zone divisions. Salem Railway Junction has been rated as the cleanest station among the divisional headquarters railway stations and also the ninth cleanest railway station in the entire country, according to a survey report published in June 2017. Other major railway stations catering to the city include Salem Town, Salem Market, Omalur Junction, Karuppur railway station and Ayothiapattinam railway station.

Air

Airports Authority of India (AAI) opened the airport in 1993 for commercial operations. Kingfisher Airlines flew from Chennai but ended its service in October 2011 due to low occupancy. Trujet started services to Chennai in March 2018 as a part of the Udaan scheme by Government of India as well as Air Odisha gives connectivity to Bengaluru and Pondicherry from June 2018. The nearest major airports are Tiruchirappalli (152 km) and Coimbatore (148 km).

Sports
Gandhi Stadium, built originally for cricket, also hosts athletic meets, football, Volleyball and basketball. Salem District Cricket Association (SDCA) has 47 teams in league cricket. The city has 2 international standard turf grounds. The Green Valley Sports club Cricket ground is on the outskirts of Salem city. This newly inaugurated ground is the home ground for Salem Spartans, a TNPL team and also the second home ground for the Indian Premier League team of Chennai Super Kings.

T. Natarajan, who hails from Salem, made his international debut for the India cricket team in December 2020 He plays in the Indian Premier League for Sunrisers Hyderabad and is nicknamed as "Yorker King" for his accurate Yorkers at death overs in T20 games. In the 2020 IPL season, delivered a whopping 96 yorkers in 16 IPL matches this year. He played a major role for India to win the Dettol T20 Series 2020 in Australia.

Mariyappan Thangavelu from Salem is an Indian Paralympic high jumper. He represented India in the 2016 Summer Paralympic games held in Rio de Janeiro in the men's high jump T-42 category, winning the gold medal in the finals.

City-based teams

Education

Salem has several educational institutions with Arts and Science colleges affiliated to Periyar University founded in 1997.
The Government College of Engineering was founded in 1966. 
The Government Mohan Kumaramangalam Medical College was established in 1986. 
The Institute of Handloom Technology (IIHT), Salem was established in 1960 by Ministry of Textiles. 
The Government Law College was opened in August 2019.
Sona College of Technology founded 1997
Vinayaka Mission's Kirupananda Variyar Engineering College founded 1987
Thiagarajar Polytechnic College founded 1958

Sister cities
Salem has one sister city:
 Salem, Oregon, USA
As of 2014, there was talk of reviving the now-stagnant Sister City project launched in 1964 with Salem in Oregon, USA.

Notable people

Arts, entertainment and television
 Sasi, film director
 S. D. Sundharam, Indian Tamil playwright, dialogue writer and lyricist.
 Arivazhagan Venkatachalam, Tamil film director
 Arthur A. Wilson, cinematographer
 Taj Noor, music director
 Satish, actor

Mathematics, science and technology
 A. R. Rao, Indian mathematician.
 Tiruvadi Sambasiva Venkataraman, an Indian botanist, agronomist and plant geneticist.

Media
 P. Varadarajulu Naidu, the founder of The Indian Express.

Politics
 Edappadi K. Palaniswami, Former Chief Minister of Tamil Nadu  (Feb 2017 to May 2021).
 Veerapandy S. Arumugam, served as the Minister for Rural Development and Local Administration and the Minister for Agriculture.
 P. Dhanapal, Ex- Speaker for the Tamil Nadu Legislative Assembly.
 Rangarajan Kumaramangalam, served as the Minister of State for Law, Justice and Company Affairs in the P. V. Narasimha Rao government from July 1991 to December 1993 and as the Union Minister for Power in the Vajpayee Government from 1998 to 2000.
 K. Rajaram, served as the Speaker of the Tamil Nadu Legislative Assembly from 1980 to 1985.
 T. V. Rajeswar, Governor of Arunachal Pradesh (1983-1985), Sikkim (1985-1989), West Bengal (1989-1990), Uttar Pradesh (2004-2009).
 Vazhappady K. Ramamurthy, served as minister of state for Labour with independent charge in the Congress government led by P. V. Narasimha Rao for a brief period in 1991.
 T. M. Selvaganapathy, Minister of Local Administration in J.Jayalalitha Government between 1991 and 1996.
 P. Subbarayan, was the Chief Minister of Madras Presidency, India's ambassador to Indonesia and Union Minister of Transport and Communications in Jawaharlal Nehru's government.

Sports
 Thangarasu Natarajan, an Indian cricketer.
 M. R. Srinivasaprasad, cricketer, represented Young India in Zimbabwe (1983/84).
 Mariyappan Thangavelu, an Indian Paralympic high jumper, India's first Paralympian gold medalist since 2004.
 P. V. Nandhidhaa, Indian Chess player, India's 17th Woman Grandmaster. Refer List of Indian chess players.

Others
 Arthanareesa Varma (1874–1964), freedom fighter, poet, author and journalist

Salem Day
The Salem city was formed on 1 November 1866. Salem City Municipal Council celebrated its Centenary in 1966. Fittingly the Municipality was upgraded into a special grade Municipality on 1 April 1979. The Centurion Municipality was declared as the Salem City Municipal Corporation The date of formation of Salem city is recognised as Salem day and it is celebrated by the people all over the city.  Salem city celebrates its birthday every year on the first of November.

See also
 Salem metropolitan area
 Economy of Salem, Tamil Nadu

References

External links

 

 NIC website for Salem, Tamil Nadu 
 Police and prisons
 

 
Cities and towns in Salem district
Smart cities in India